
This is a list of players who graduated from the Challenge Tour in 2018. The top 15 players on the Challenge Tour rankings in 2018 earned European Tour cards for 2019.

* European Tour rookie in 2019
† First-time member ineligible for Rookie of the Year award
T = Tied
 The player retained his European Tour card for 2020 (finished inside the top 115).
 The player did not retain his European Tour card for 2020, but retained conditional status (finished between 116 and 155, inclusive).
 The player did not retain his European Tour card for 2020 (finished outside the top 155).

Koivu earned promotion to the European Tour in August after his third Challenge Tour win of the season.

Winners on the European Tour in 2019

Runners-up on the European Tour in 2019

See also
2018 European Tour Qualifying School graduates

References

Challenge Tour
European Tour
Challenge Tour Graduates
Challenge Tour Graduates